Claire Bertrand (born 7 September 1982), is a former French Women's International motorcycle trials rider. Bertrand is 7 times French Women's Trials Champion, winning the title in 2000 through 2006 inclusive and was a member of the winning French Women's TDN team in 2004.

Biography
In 2000 Bertrand won the French Women's Trials Championship, this was to be the start of a seven-year unbeaten run. She was also a member of the French TDN team that finished runner-up to a strong Spanish team. To round out the season Bertrand finished 3rd in the Inaugural Women's Trials World Championship behind Laia Sanz and Iris Kramer.

Another French title went to Bertrand in 2001, along with 3rd place once again in the World Championships. A feat repeated in 2002.

In 2003 Bertrand again won the French Championship, this time ahead of Marlene Satge.

2004 was to be a good year for Bertrand. She not only added another French title to her haul but also led the French TDN Women's team of Satge and Marilyn Journet to victory over the Japanese and Spanish teams in Spain. She was also to score her best International positions by finishing runner-up to Sanz in both the European and World Championships.

The 2005 defence of the TDN title didn't go exactly as planned with the French team rolling home in 5th place. A sixth French title was added in 2005 when she won ahead of TDN teammate Journet.
A seventh French National title was won in 2006, and Bertrand once again found herself amongst the top in the European Championships, returning to 3rd place once more behind Sanz and Kramer.

International Trials Championship Career

Honors
 French Women's Trials Champion 2000, 2001, 2002, 2003, 2004, 2005, 2006
 Women's TDN Winning Team Member 2004

Related Reading
FIM Trial European Championship
FIM Trial World Championship

References 

1982 births
Living people
French motorcycle racers
Motorcycle trials riders
People from Antibes
Sportspeople from Alpes-Maritimes